Hydrangea linkweiensis is a species of flowering plant in the family Hydrangeaceae, native to China.

References

External links
 Hydrangea linkweiensis at efloras.org.

linkweiensis
Flora of China